The 2012–13 2. Bundesliga was the 39th season of the 2. Bundesliga, Germany's second-level football league. The season began on 3 August 2012 and ended with the last games on 19 May 2013, with a winter break held between the weekends around 15 December 2012 and 2 February 2013.

The league comprised eighteen teams: The teams placed fourth through fifteenth of the 2011–12 season, the worst two teams from the 2011–12 Bundesliga, the best two teams from the 2011–12 3. Liga, the losers of the relegation play-off between the 16th-placed Bundesliga team and the third-placed 2. Bundesliga team and the winners of the relegation play-off between the 16th-placed 2. Bundesliga team and the third-placed 3. Liga team.

Teams
At the end of the 2011–12 season, SpVgg Greuther Fürth and Eintracht Frankfurt were directly promoted to the 2012–13 Bundesliga. Greuther Fürth left the second level after fifteen seasons and will make debut for top level, while Eintracht only made a cameo appearance in the league. The two promoted teams were replaced by 1. FC Köln and 1. FC Kaiserslautern, who were relegated at the end of the 2011–12 Bundesliga season. Köln re-entered the second level after four consecutive Bundesliga seasons, while Kaiserslautern returned to the 2. Bundesliga after two years.

On the other end of the table, Alemannia Aachen and Hansa Rostock were directly relegated to the 2012–13 3. Liga. Aachen dropped to the third tier for the first time since the 1998–99 season, while Rostock concluded a cameo appearance in the league. The two relegated clubs will be replaced with 2011–12 3. Liga champions SV Sandhausen and runners-up VfR Aalen, who earned direct promotion spots are thus both made their debut on this level of the league system.

Two further spots were available via two-legged play-offs. The playoff between 16th-placed 2011–12 Bundesliga sides Hertha BSC and third-placed 2011–12 2. Bundesliga team Fortuna Düsseldorf ended 4–3 on aggregate for the latter. Consequently, Fortuna finished a three-year spell at second level and returned to the Bundesliga after fifteen years in lower leagues; in turn, Hertha concluded a cameo appearance at the top level and returned to the 2. Bundesliga. However, this decision is provisional since Hertha have appealed against the result of the second leg, which was marred by several incidents of crowd disturbance.

Elsewhere, the playoff between 16th-placed 2011–12 2. Bundesliga sides Karlsruher SC and third-placed 2011–12 3. Liga team Jahn Regensburg ended 3–3 on aggregate and saw Jahn promoted via the away goal rule. The Bavarian club returned to the second level after eight years; in turn, Karlsruhe finished a three-year spell at the second level and returned to the third level for the first time since the 2000–01 season.

Stadiums and locations
Five clubs expanded the seating capacities of their stadiums. Following their promotion, Aalen, Jahn Regensburg and Sandhausen all increased the capacity of their stadiums to 12,500, 13,251 and 12,100 spectators, respectively. Elsewhere, St. Pauli's Millerntor-Stadion was undergoing reconstruction during the autumn as the entire Back Straight was being rebuilt. Finally, 1860 Munich will benefit from an expansion of Allianz Arena by co-tenants and city rivals Bayern Munich, who increased the total capacity of the ground to 71,000 people in late August 2012.

An additional three clubs will have a slightly decreased capacity, as Eintracht Braunschweig, FSV Frankfurt and Union Berlin all are rebuilding a stand of their stadiums. Braunschweig will thus be able to host 22,100 spectators, while Frankfurt and Union can accommodate 10,470 and 16,750 people, respectively, during reconstruction.

Notes
 The total capacity of Allianz Arena was 69,000 people before being expanded to 71,000 in late August 2012.
 Stadium is under reconstruction for all of the 2012–13 season.
 Stadium is under reconstruction during the 2012–13 season. The capacity will increase to 12,542 spectators upon completion of the works.

Personnel and sponsorships

Managerial changes

League table

Results

Relegation play-offs

Dynamo Dresden, who finished 16th, faced VfL Osnabrück, the third-placed 2012–13 3. Liga side for a two-legged play-off. The winner on aggregate score after both matches will earn a spot in the 2013–14 2. Bundesliga. The two sides met in the same fixture two seasons ago, although this time the roles are reversed.

Dynamo Dresden won 2–1 on aggregate and retained its 2. Bundesliga spot for the 2013–14 season.

Season statistics

Top scorers

Top assists

Hat-tricks

Scoring
 First goal of the season: Stefan Leitl for FC Ingolstadt 04 against FC Energie Cottbus (3 August 2012)
 Fastest goal of the season: Idir Ouali for Dynamo Dresden against MSV Duisburg (25 August 2012)

 Largest winning margin: 5 goals
 Erzgebirge Aue 6–1 VfL Bochum (27 October 2012)
 SV Sandhausen 1–6 Hertha BSC (9 November 2012)
 Highest scoring game: 7 goals
 Erzgebirge Aue 6–1 VfL Bochum (27 October 2012)
 SV Sandhausen 1–6 Hertha BSC (9 November 2012)
 VfL Bochum 5–2 SV Sandhausen (18 November 2012)
 Eintracht Braunschweig 4–3 1. FC Union Berlin (17 December 2012)

References

External links
  
  

2. Bundesliga seasons
2012–13 in German football leagues
Germany